The Harvard Law School Parody is an annual parody musical put on by students at Harvard Law School. Over the Parody's week-long run every spring, more than half of Harvard Law School's entire student body attends the show.

History 

The Harvard Law School Drama Society dates back to 1961.  During its existence, the Drama Society has performed a variety of humorous pieces focused on the law school experience, including musical revues and sketch comedy shows.  Since the late 1980s, the Drama Society has focused exclusively on the Parody.  Recent Parody themes have included The Hark Knight (referring to Harvard Law School's Student Center, known by students as "The Hark," and a spoof of The Dark Knight); Ocean's Replevin (a spoof of Ocean's Eleven); Twilitem: De Novo Moon (a spoof of Twilight); and Martha Minow and the J.D. Factory (referring to Harvard Law School Dean Martha Minow, and a spoof of Charlie and the Chocolate Factory).  More than 70 Harvard Law School Students participate in the Parody every year.

Past Performances 
 2005: Finding Nemo Contributorily Negligent
 2007: The Da Vinci Model Penal Code
 2008: Harry ‘Issue’ Spotter and the Goblet of Breyer
 2009: The Hark Night
 2010: Ocean's Replevin
 2011: Twilitem: De Novo Moon
 2023: Scooby Due Process

2013 Theme - "The Wizard of Laws" 

The 2013 Harvard Law Parody followed Dorothy, Scarebro, Tina Tinman, and Lionel as they attempted to obtain the comb of Wicked Witch Noah Feldman. The HLS Drama Society performed five nights from March 2, 2013 through March 6, 2013.  The show ran to generally positive reviews.

2014 Theme - "The Lawyer King: The Circle of Law" 

The 2014 edition of the Parody followed Simba ("It's a very common name"), the 1L son of Dean Minfasa and heir-apparent to the Deanship, and Nala, another 1L, around the HLS campus during orientation, the 1L Cup games, on-campus interviews with law firms, the Ames Moot Court Room, and to the WilmerHale Legal Services Center in Jamaica Plain, MA, as Professor Alan Dershowitz (filling the role of Scar) takes over the campus with the help of the Federalist Society (similar to the hyenas) instead of embarking on his impending retirement.

The show ran five nights from February 27, 2014 through March 3, 2014.  The show featured unprecedented special lighting, audio, and video effects, including lines read by Dershowitz on recorded video as he had moved to New York after retiring in December 2013, as well as the most professor cameos to date in a Parody, including Professors Jon Hanson (filling a Timon-like role), Dean Alexa Shabecoff (in a Pumba-like role), Charles Nesson (filling a Rafiki-like role), Charles Ogletree (as himself), Jeannie Suk (as herself), Bob Bordone (as himself), Jonathan Zittrain (as himself), Dean Martha Minow (in a Mufasa-like role), Dean Ellen Cosgrove (as a Zazu-like character), Dean Mark Weber (as himself),  Mark Tushnet (as himself), and Charles Fried (as himself).  The show was met with a positive review from the HL Record, whose small readership was itself mocked in good taste by the show.

Additionally, the 2014 Parody moved away from a nearly 3-hour script to almost under 2 hours, while still employing 9 songs parodies and dance numbers:

The opening theme from the Lion King 
R. Kelly's "Remix to Ignition" (as "Admission") 
Robin Thicke's "Blurred Lines" (as "What I Learned 1L")
Wham!'s "Wake Me Up Before You Go Go" (as "Pay up, This Ain't Pro Bono")
NSync's "Tearin' Up My Heart" (as "Tearin' Up The Hark"—HLS's cafeteria)
Lady Gaga's "Poker Face" (as "Posner Case")
Miley Cyrus' "Wrecking Ball" (as "Damn Cold Call")
Coolio's "Gangsta's Paradise" (as "Gunner's Paradise")
Journey's "Don't Stop Believin'" (as "Don't Stop Achievin'")  

The dance arrangements ranged from full cast interpretative dances and five-man boy band moves to hip-hop and ballet.

2015 Theme - "Beauty v. The Beast" 

The 2015 Harvard Law Parody told the story of Beast, a 3L cursed to relive 1L year until he could love another person more than he loved the Harvard name. The production bid farewell to outgoing Dean of Students Ellen Cosgrove and ran from February 27 to March 3. Morgan Menchata and Tyler Vigen produced the show, and Maggie Dunbar was head writer.

The show's songs included:
 Harvard Law (Shake It Off)
 Screwed (Rude)
 All About That Case (All About That Bass)
 At the Charles (When I'm Gone)
 The Ames Competition (Eye of the Tiger)
 Gunner (Fancy)
 Party with My BSA (Party in the U.S.A.)
 I Don't Know (Let It Go)
 Livin' on a Prayer (Livin' on a Prayer)

2016 Theme - "Law Wars: Attack of the Loans" 

In Law Wars, career adviser Darth Weber seeks to convert all the 1Ls to the Private Side of the law, and only an alliance of public interest students can stand against him. With the help of Obi-Jon Hanson and Hans YOLO, our heroes must infiltrate EIP, locate the reclusive Master Nesson (Charles Nesson), and do something about the giant laser on top of Gropius that could blow them all up at any minute.

The 2016 production sold out twice, drawing an audience of over 1,700 from February 27 to March 1. The show was written under the direction of head writer Anna Byers, culminating in a 90-student production led by producers Mario Cuttone and Jason Joffe.

The set list included:
 Harvard Funk (Uptown Funk)
 Blank Schedule (Blank Space)
 SCOTUS (Sugar)
 Outline (Love Song)
 Subciter (Survivor)
 Admissions (Hello)
 Love After Law (Believe)
 BSA (I'll Make a Man Out of You)
 All Thanks to Harvard Law (Like a Prayer)

2017 Theme - "Harry Palsgraf in Fantastic Briefs and Where to File Them" 
Harry Palsgraf told the story of three intrepid 1Ls at Harvard School of Lawcraft and Resume Padding (Harry Palsgraf, Hermione Gunner, and Ron Westlaw) who must survive 1L and defeat an evil league of professors by finding the elusive Barrister's Outline. The evil professors succeed in resurrecting late Supreme Court Justice Antonin Scalia with the goal of returning the school to its original competitive, miserable intent. With the help of Dean Dumbleminow (Martha Minow) and a ragtag group of students and professors, Harry, Ron, and Hermione work to keep the law school from going back to letter grades and eternal subcites. 

Harry Palgraf ran from Feb. 24 through 28. Ben Burkett led the writing team, and the show was produced by Molly Malavey and Cayman Mitchell, with Elisabeth Mabus as Assistant Producer.

The 2017 Parody setlist included:
 You Don't Know Your Bluebook Rules (What Makes You Beautiful)
 This Girl Goes to Harvard (Girl on Fire)
 Harvard Won't Fail Anyone (Alexander Hamilton)
 My Mumps (My Humps)
 Harvard Gunners (Anaconda)
 Scandals (Royals)

References

External links 
 

Harvard Law School